Ruse (also transliterated as Rousse, Russe) is the fifth largest city in Bulgaria. Thanks to its location and its railway and road bridge over the Danube (Danube Bridge), it is the most significant Bulgarian river port, serving an important part of the international trade of the country.

Ruse is known for its 19th- and 20th-century Neo-Baroque and Neo-Rococo architecture, which attracts many tourists. It is often called the Little Vienna. The Ruse-Giurgiu Friendship Bridge, until 14 June 2013 the only one in the shared Bulgarian-Romanian section of the Danube, crosses the river here.

Ruse is the birthplace of the Nobel laureate in Literature Elias Canetti and the writer Michael Arlen.

The average altitude is  AMSL. The urban area is an approximately 11-km ellipse running along the river. The city extends from the land-connected Matey island and the mouth of Rusenski Lom on the west to Srabcheto hill on the east. During the 20th century, the west end of the city was significantly modified by moving the mouth of Rusenski Lom to the west, as well as by moving the bank itself with its fairway considerably to the north. The Rousse TV Tower is built there on the remains of Leventtabia, a former Turkish fortification.

Geography
Ruse is located in the northeastern part of the country, on the right bank of the Danube, opposite the Romanian city of Giurgiu, approximately 75 km (47 mi) south of Bucharest, Romania's capital, 200 km (124 mi) from the Bulgarian Black Sea Coast and 300 km (186 mi) from the capital Sofia.

Climate 

Ruse has a continental climate (Köppen climate classification Dfa) with very hot summers and relatively cold winters. Owing to its position on the Danubian Plain, the city's winters can get windy.

Temperatures frequently reach  in mid-summer in the city centre and stay as low as  during the nights. The highest temperature recorded was 44.0 C and the lowest was −22.8 C.

History

Etymology 
Scholars suggest that the city on the river bank derived its present name from the Finnish root ruskea meaning "blonde", or *ru- ("river", "stream") or from the Cherven fortress, meaning "red," through the root rous, which is present in many Slavic languages.

A popular legend claims that the name Ruse comes from Finnish ruskea, or the name of a female founder of the city, whose name was Rusa, meaning "blonde hair". In the 13th and 14th centuries, during the time of the Second Bulgarian Empire, a fortified settlement called Rusi, first mentioned in 1380, emerged near the ruins of the earlier Roman town.

Other theories include settlement by people from the Rus era; a connection to the village of Rusokastro in Burgas Province; an unattested tribe of Getae with a name such as Riusi, or; the pagan festival of Rosalia.

Antiquity 
The city emerged from a Neolithic settlement of the 3rd to 2nd millennium BCE, when pottery, fishing, agriculture, and hunting developed. Excavations have revealed several layers, suggesting that the place was attacked by neighbouring tribes and suffered from natural disasters. Ancient sanctuaries were found nearby, where idols of a pregnant woman, a fertility goddess, were prevalent.

The later Thracian settlement developed into a Roman military and naval centre during the reign of Vespasian (69–70 CE), as part of the fortification system along the northern boundary of Moesia. Its name, Sexaginta Prista, suggests a meaning of "a city of 60 ships" (from  — "60" and  — a special type of guard ship), based on the supposed 60 nearby berths.

The fortress was on the main road between Singidunum (modern Belgrade) and the Danube Delta and was destroyed in the 6th century by Avar and Slavic raids. Hungarian historian Felix Philipp Kanitz was the first to identify Sexaginta Prista with Ruse, but the Škorpil brothers demonstrated the link later through studying inscriptions, coins, graves, and objects of daily life. An inscription from the reign of Diocletian proves that the city was rebuilt as a praesidium (a large fortification) after it was destroyed by the Goths in 250 CE.

The settlement was mentioned as Golyamo Yorgovo in the Middle Ages, whose present successor is Giurgiu in Romania.

Ottoman rule 

During Ottoman rule, the invaders destroyed the town, reacting to a 1595 unsuccessful liberation attempt by a joint Vlach-Bulgarian army, led by Michael the Brave. After its rebuilding in the following years, Ruse was dubbed Rusçuk (Turkish for "little Ruse") and had again expanded into a large fortress by the 18th century. It later grew into one of the most important Ottoman towns on the Danube and an administrative centre of Tuna Vilayet, which extended from Varna and Tulcea to Sofia and Niš.

The Dunav newspaper appeared — it was the first printed in Bulgaria and in Bulgarian. Some Bulgarian schools were founded. The streets are renamed and numbered for the first time in Bulgarian lands. A post office, hospital, home for the aged were founded. Three empires met here for trading: Austro-Hungary, Russia, British Empire. France and Italy opened consulates in Ruse. The modern city arose from the shades of the settlement. In 1865 the Obraztsov Chiflik was founded on the place where the English Consul's farm was; it was the first modern farm on the territory of the whole Ottoman Empire of that time.

Ruse developed into a centre of the Bulgarian National Revival and hosted the headquarters of the Bulgarian Revolutionary Central Committee.

Early Modern Bulgaria 

After it became part of modern Bulgaria on 20 February 1878, Ruse was one of the key cultural and economic centres of the country. Intensive building during the period changed the city's architectural appearance to a typical Central European one. Ruse is known for the many first innovations in Bulgaria, including:
 1864 – the first printing office in Bulgaria;
 1867 – the first railway line linking Ruse and Varna, was launched into operation;
 1879 – the first agronomical school "Obraztsov chiflik", today – Agricultural scientific research institute, currently profiled in agriculture and seed science;
 1881 – the first steel ship in Bulgaria was built;
 1881 – the first privately owned Bulgarian bank Girdap;
 1881 – the Machine School for the Navy, the first technical school in Bulgaria. Later it was moved to Varna;
 1883 – the first Weather station;
 1884 – the first Bulgarian pharmacy association;
 1885 – the first Bulgarian technical association was instituted;
 1890 – the first Chamber of Commerce and Industry;
 1891 – the first private insurance company "Bulgaria";
 1896 – the first manually operated elevator;
 1897 – the first movie projection. The second was a month later in the capital Sofia;

Ruse had the first Bulgarian factories for soda water, lemonade, and for neckties. The first aviator Simeon Petrov was born in Ruse.

In the newly liberated Bulgaria of the late 19th century, Ruse was a cosmopolitan city with a multiethnic population. According to the first census conducted in 1883, ethnic Bulgarians made up 43% of the population, Turks 39%, and Jews 7%.

"All façades on main streets of Russe shall have rich decorations with plastic stone", postulate the Regulations for Constructions of Private Buildings of 1893, issued by the Municipality of Russe.

After knyaz Alexander Battenberg's 1886 abdication, and as a reaction to the regentship's course led by prime minister Stefan Stambolov, a group of Russophile (pro-Russian) military officers revolted in Ruse. The riot was violently crushed, and 13 of the leaders were quickly sentenced to death and executed near the city, which caused much public discontent. Decades later, in 1934, local citizens raised funds and built a monument at the place where the Russophile officers were executed. The monument was blown up in 1940 but rebuilt in 1966 at approximately the same spot.

Early 20th century 
 1908 – The first factory for iron beds in Modern Bulgaria. Today Ruse is a major centre of furniture manufacturing.
 1911 was marked off with the start of a project for an electrical station by "Siemens-Schukert". On 17 February 1917 Ruse became the third electrified city in the country (after Sofia and Varna).
 In 1913 Belgian entrepreneurs and engineers were granted a concession for a period of 25 years and built the largest sugar factory in Bulgaria.

 1927 – the first sock-making factory in Bulgaria opened in Ruse. "Fazan" still exists today;
 1933 – the first oil refinery was constructed;

Between World War I and II, after Southern Dobruja was lost to Romania, the economic significance of the city decreased. So did the population: Ruse was no longer the second-largest city in Bulgaria (after former East Rumelian capital Plovdiv), being quickly surpassed by Sofia and Varna. Foreign consulates were closed, except for the Russian one, which has remained functional since. Only for the period between 1919 and 1920 the capital loss is estimated at around 40 million leva.

World War II period 
The return of Southern Dobrudja to Bulgaria in September 1940 fostered good conditions for the restoration of the city's leading role. It became a provincial centre, and economic activity revived. Typical for the post-war architecture of the city was the wide use of iron, concrete and glass as construction materials. Examples are the River port – 1931, the Freight station – 1935, Market Hall – 1939 and the Court house – 1940.

See also:
 Ruse blood wedding

Communist period 

The construction of the Ruse-Giurgiu bridge in 1954 and the fast industrialization gave a new push to development. Ruse emerged again as an important economic, transport, cultural, and education hub. Engineering, chemical, and light industries expanded; a large harbor was built, and the city became a university centre. At the 1985 census, a population of more than 186,000 was reported.

In the early 1980s, Ruse entered a dark period. The Verachim factory was built in Giurgiu, which polluted the air between 1980 and 1991, impacting the city's development. The population decreased, and 15,000 people moved out between 1985 and 1992. The first informal organization in Bulgaria under the communist regime was established here - The Public Committee for Environmental Protection of Ruse, which provoked the first nationwide demonstrations and strongly influenced the change to democracy. In 1991, the Romanian factory ceased the pollution, after the fall of the communist regime in Romania.

Democratic Bulgaria 

Like other post-socialist regimes in eastern Europe, Bulgaria found the transition to capitalism rather painful and not as easy as expected. State-owned enterprises lost their former markets and could not adapt to the now free-market competition. This led to massive unemployment in the city and emigration waves in the 90s. Since 2000, Ruse has been continually regaining its former leading status. The urban economics were positively influenced by the 2007's accession of Bulgaria and Romania in the European Union, which allowed deeper cross-border cooperation. The flow of investments through EU funds restarted long suspended projects which were finally completed.

After decades of construction, the new corpus of the University of Ruse was inaugurated in 2010.

In 2011 the city's centre was renovated through an EU project, worth 10 million leva. Included in the project, a Dry Deck Fountain was introduced in an urban environment for the first time in Bulgaria. The exterior of the Rousse State Opera was reconditioned.

A water treatment facility, an investment worth 57 million Euro, is now functional.

In 2012 the Rousse Regional Historical Museum completed a project, which allowed the rehabilitation and display of the remains of the Roman city Sexaginta Prista.

Ignat Kaneff, a Bulgarian-born Canadian business magnate, endowed about half of the amount necessary for the construction of a modern conference complex named after him, the Kaneff Centre, at the University of Ruse. It was officially opened on 10 October 2013.

A landmark event for the city was the opening of the new Eco Museum & Aquarium in 2014.

A safer and more efficient navigation in the inland waterways was accomplished with a new structure – the river information system BulRIS. A modern oncology centre is now operating.

Ruse was a candidate for a European Capital of Culture in 2019 with the concept "Free spirit city".

Dohodno zdanie, an imposing Neoclassical edifice in the city centre convincingly won the National competition "Emblematic building of the year" in 2014. Ruse was a host city of the first of its kind in Bulgaria – an International Ice Figures Festival.

The Arena Ruse sports hall with more than 5100 seats opened on 23 July 2015 nearly 40 years after initial construction efforts began. The project was suspended on numerous occasions due to a lack of financing. An underground parking inside the sports hall has also been completed.

On-going projects are the re-cultivation of the old landfill, worth 22,5 million leva. The biggest roundabout in the city with underpasses for pedestrians and cyclists, worth some 10 million leva was reconstructed.

Notable residents

Main sights

Architectural landmarks 
Ruse is one of the 100 Tourist Sites of Bulgaria. The city is known for its preserved buildings from the end of the 19th and the beginning of the 20th century. There are 272 monuments of culture. Most of the sights of the city are located at the center of Ruse (museums, architectural landmarks, the theater, the opera, hotels, restaurants, cafes and souvenir shops). Among the sights the following are outstanding:

Natural landmarks

Culture

Theatres and opera houses 
Noted for its rich culture, Ruse hosts a philharmonic orchestra, the Rousse State Opera (founded in 1949) and the "Sava Ognianov" theater.

Museums and exhibitions

Libraries 
 The Regional Library "Lyuben Karavelov"
 The Austrian Library, located in the 2nd floor of the theater and home of the International Elias Canetti Society.

Regular events 
 The March Music Days is an international music festival for classical music.
 St George's Day (6 May) is Ruse's holiday. A local fair is organized for a week around this date.
 Ruse Carnival is a masquerade held around 24 June, Enyovden.
 The Sexaginta Prista Summer Stage is an urban festival. Events are hosted at the Roman castle every Friday from May through October.
 At the end of October are BG MediaMarket and the Bulgarian Europe Media Festival.
 The Skate-Festival "Collision Course" is taking place in May since 2007.
 Since 2008 the Literary Spring Parlour is organized by the International Elias Canetti Society in April or May.

Religious buildings 

 Holy Trinity Cathedral
 Church of All Saints
 Church of the Holy Theotokos
 Church of St George
 Church of Holy Archangel Michael
 Church of the Holy Ascension
 Church of St Petka
 Russian Church of St Nicholas the Miracle Worker
 Roman Catholic St Paul of the Cross Cathedral, built 1890
 Armenian Surp Astvadzadzin Church
 Evangelical Baptist church
 Evangelical Methodist Church
 Seid Pasha Mosque

In 1978, the "All Saints" Church was destroyed and the Pantheon of National Revival Heroes was built thereupon.

The Jewish community in Ruse built and consecrated a synagogue in 1797. It was destroyed in the 1810 fire, but two other synagogues were later built in 1826 and 1852.

Economy and infrastructure

Economic activity 

The average number of employees under labour contract in 2016 is 68 603 people, while the average annual salary – 4 683 euro, 60% higher compared to the 2007's statistics. The employment rate for people from the age of 15 to 64 is 57.7%, whereas the unemployment is 12.5%.

The relative share of the population aged between 25 and 64 years with higher education is 23.6%, 3% higher than in 2007. The relative share of the population aged between 25 and 64 years with secondary education is 57.5%, 3.2% higher than in 2007. 147 300 is the number of nights spent by tourists in 2013. The total number of enterprises is 10 830.

Foreign direct investment in non-financial enterprises for 2013 is 197 million euro. The total economic output, manufactured in the city is assessed at about 1.84 billion euro, while the revenue increases with 916 000 euro compared to 2007 – to 3.1 million euro for 2013.

Economic profile 

Ruse is a large industrial centre. It has a duty-free zone and 2 industrial zones: East and West. Ruse Iztok Power Plant has an energy producing capacity of 400 MW and the Ruse West Power Plant has 41 MW. There are a logistics park and a business park in the city. The city's economy is dominated by light industry — tailoring, textiles and food processing. Big manufactures are Fazan (the first factory for socks in Bulgaria), Fenix 94 (socks), Ariston S (women's fashion), Bordo (women's fashion), Danini (lady's fashion), Top Man (men's fashion), Karina (lady's fashion) and Sirma Prista (dairy products). The petroleum industry and the chemical industry are represented by companies, producing paints and motor oils – Orgachim, Prista Oil, Lubrica, Megachim, EKON 91, Ninachim and Polysan. The machinery industry and ships construction are well developed. Also, one of the world's leading companies in yacht design Vripack has an architecture and engineering studio in Ruse.

There are 65 hotels and 1,769 beds in Ruse. The income from accommodations for the fourth quarter of 2011 г. is 1,661,294 lv.

There are many hypermarkets such as Metro Cash & Carry, Kaufland, Mr. Bricolage, Praktiker, and some supermarket chains such as Billa, Lidl, and Carrefour. The market hall Gradski Hali, located in the city centre, is now operated by CBA, a Hungarian supermarket chain.

Transportation 

Ruse is a major road and railway hub in Northern Bulgaria. Railway transportation in the city dates back to 1867 when it became a station of the first railway line in Bulgaria Ruse – Varna. There are railways to Southern Bulgaria, Sofia, Varna and Bucharest. Ruse has two railway stations for passenger services (Ruse Central and Ruse Razpredelitelna) and two for freight transport services. There are intercity buses that link Ruse with cities and towns all over the country, as well as in other European nations. They are based in two bus stations: South and East.

Ruse has an extensive public transport system with around 30 bus and trolleybus lines, including the Ruse trolleybus system. Since the sale of all shares of the private Israeli transport holding Egged Ruse to the local municipality in 2017, trolleybus lines have been operated by the city's own public transport entity. Urban and suburban bus lines remain under concession to various private Bulgarian transport companies. A 14 kilometer bicycle network along the main boulevards of the city has been developed and is currently in the process of expansion.

It is owned by the municipality of Ruse, with an active license for small passenger and cargo flights (license issued on 21.12.2016). The runway is long enough for Boeing 747s (Jumbo Jets).

The Danube bridge is located east of Ruse. It was the only road and rail bridge between Bulgaria and Romania until the opening of a second bridge crossing to Romania on 14 June 2013 at Vidin.

Ruse is the biggest Bulgarian port towns on the bank of the Danube River. This key position has determined the 19th century-long co-existence of different cultures and religions in Ruse.

Education 
There is one university in Ruse – "Angel Kanchev" University of Ruse with a capacity of 15 000 students. The university's structure includes a subsidiaries in Silistra, Vidin and Razgrad. There is also a subsidiary of the College of Agriculture – Plovdiv in the city.

The city hosts 26 high schools, among which is the English Language School "Geo Milev".

Demographics 
Ruse is the fifth largest city in Bulgaria by population. It was the most populated city of Bulgaria in 1880 with 26,163 people.
The number of the residents of the city(not the municipality) reached its peak around 1990, numbering almost 200,000. According to the 2011 census, Ruse was inhabited by 149,642 people within the city limits, while the Ruse Municipality along with the legally affiliated adjacent villages had 167,585 inhabitants.

 "Population" – Permanent and current address at the same place

Migration

Ethnic, linguistic and religious composition 
According to the latest 2011 census data, the individuals declared their ethnic identity were distributed as follows:
Bulgarians: 123 469 (90.4%)
Turks: 10 128 (7.5%)
Romani: 1,297 (0.9%)
Others: 1,132 (0.8%)
Indefinable: 618 (0.5%)
Undeclared: 12,998 (8.7%)

According to the first census in 1883, the ethnic composition was as follows:
Bulgarians: 11,342
Turks: 10,252
Jews: 1,943
Armenians: 841
Germans: 476
Greeks: 291
Vlachs (Romanians): 231
Russians: 170
Serbs and Croats: 113
79 Romani, 76 Hungarians, 74 Tatars, 58 Italians, 58 French people, 32 English people, 19 Persians, 16 Poles, 16 Czechs, and 69 others.
Total: 26,156

International relations

Consulates 
 – General consulate
 – Honorary Consulate

Twin towns and sister cities 

Ruse is twinned with:

 Bijeljina, Bosnia and Herzegovina
 Giurgiu, Romania
 Huainan, China
 Peristeri, Greece
 Saint-Ouen-sur-Seine, France
 Trogir, Croatia
 Újbuda (Budapest), Hungary
 Volgograd, Russia

Honours 
Ruse Peak (800 m) on Livingston Island in the South Shetland Islands, Antarctica is named after the city.

Gallery

References

External links 

 
 Ruse municipality
 Ruse location on Google maps 
 Detailed map of Ruse on Bgmaps

 
Populated places in Ruse Province
Port cities and towns in Bulgaria
Ancient Roman buildings and structures in Bulgaria
Bulgaria–Romania border crossings
Populated places on the Danube
Baroque architecture in Bulgaria
Rococo architecture
Jewish communities